Dean Barker (born 2 August 1970) is a former British international speedway rider who competed at the sports highest level until his retirement in 2007.

Speedway career
Barker rode in the top tier of British Speedway from 1986–2007, riding for various clubs. He was an integral part of the Eastbourne Eagles team that won the league during the 1995 Premier League speedway season.

His farewell meeting in 2009 celebrated a career which included highlights of becoming Eastbourne Eagles captain and racing to podiums in major competitions such as the British Under 21 Championship and the British Championship.

References

1970 births
Living people
British speedway riders
Cradley Heathens riders
Eastbourne Eagles riders
Oxford Cheetahs riders